Major General Harry John Collins (December 7, 1895 – March 8, 1963) was a decorated senior United States Army officer who commanded the 42nd "Rainbow" Infantry Division during World War II.

Early life and military career
Collins was born on December 7, 1895, in Chicago, Illinois. He graduated from the Western Military Academy in 1915 and attended the University of Chicago before leaving in 1917 to join the United States Army after American entry into World War I.

Collins completed the course at the Officer Training Camp in Little Rock, Arkansas, in 1917, received his commission as a second lieutenant in the Infantry Branch, and was assigned to the 3rd Infantry Regiment.

Collins served with the 3rd Infantry on the Mexican Border at Eagle Pass, Texas, at the end of the Pancho Villa Expedition and during World War I.

Between the wars
Collins remained with the 3rd Infantry, including assignments at Camp Sherman, Ohio, and Fort Snelling, Minnesota. In 1922, he was assigned to the 19th Infantry Regiment at Schofield Barracks, Hawaii. He completed the Infantry Officer Course at Fort Benning, Georgia in 1926 and remained there as an instructor on the staff of the U.S. Army Infantry School. From 1929 to 1930, he was an instructor at Fort Ethan Allen, Vermont, and he completed the Infantry Advanced Course at Fort Benning in 1930.

A specialist with the placement and marksmanship of machine guns, he operated schools for machine gun operators at Fort Sam Houston, Texas, and Fort Warren in the early 1930s. Collins graduated from the U.S. Army Command and General Staff School in 1934 and the U.S. Army War College in 1935.

He then served again in Hawaii, and in 1938 moved to Vancouver Barracks, Washington, where he was the Plans, Operations and Training Officer (S3) for the 7th Infantry Regiment, and then commanded the regiment's 1st Battalion. After his battalion command he served as regimental executive officer until being assigned as assistant plans, operations and training officer (G3) and then intelligence officer (G2) for the 6th Infantry Division at Fort Snelling.

World War II
At the start of World War II, Collins was assigned to the staff at the U.S. War Department and was sent to the United Kingdom as an observer and liaison officer.

Upon returning to the United States in November 1941, Collins first served as the intelligence officer for the IV Corps. The United States entered the war on December 7, 1941 following the Japanese attack on Pearl Harbor. As a full colonel, he then activated the 345th Infantry Regiment at Fort Carson, part of the 87th Infantry Division. In August 1942, Collins was named as the assistant division commander (ADC) of the 99th Infantry Division at Camp Van Dorn, Mississippi, and promoted to brigadier general.

In April 1943, he assumed command of the 42nd Infantry Division (the famed Rainbow Division) at Camp Gruber, Oklahoma, and was promoted to major general. As a senior commander, Collins earned the nickname "Hollywood Harry" for his flamboyant personal conduct, including use of a motorcycle escort with flashing lights and sirens when he traveled. He trained the 42nd Division in the United States for 16 months before departure for overseas service. In December 1944, the division arrived on the Western Front in the European Theater of Operations. The 42nd Division, under Collins and aided by Brigadier General Henning Linden as his ADC, played a major role in stopping the last German drive into Western Europe, known as the Battle of the Bulge. The division then went on to take part in the Western Allied invasion of Germany.

Dachau liberation

The 42nd Division was credited with the liberation of the Dachau concentration camp. As commander of the 42nd Division, Collins had defied convention by naming Rabbi (Captain) Eli Bohnen as the division chaplain, despite not having a large number of Jews in the division. According to contemporary accounts, Collins was moved by the plight of the prisoners he saw at Dachau, and took extraordinary measures to ensure they immediately received housing, food and medical attention. His example enabled Bohnen to successfully appeal for assistance from civilians in the United States, requesting items that the army was not prepared to supply, including kosher foods, religious articles and cash donations.

Postwar

Following Victory in Europe Day, the 42nd assumed occupation duty in western Austria, with Collins serving as military governor. In July 1948, he was appointed commander of the 2nd Infantry Division at Fort Lewis, Washington, and later assumed command of New York-New Jersey area headquarters at Fort Totten, New York.

In January 1951, he was assigned to command the 8th Division at Fort Jackson, South Carolina. A year later he was appointed military attache in Moscow, afterwards returning to the United States to command the 31st Infantry Division at Camp Atterbury, Indiana.

Retirement, death and burial

He retired from the army after 37 years in 1954 and worked as a vice president for North American Van Lines and a consultant to the Human Research Organization at George Washington University.

Collins subsequently moved to Colorado, where he lived until retiring to Salzburg, where many Dachau survivors were initially transported after the liberation of the camp. In his later years he was in ill health and used a wheelchair as the result of injuries sustained in a car accident.

He died on March 8, 1963, and was buried at the Saint Peter's churchyard cemetery in Salzburg.

Family
Collins' first wife was Maude Alice McAlpin Collins (1897–1955). They were the parents of a daughter, Patricia Coyle Collins (1919-2000). Patricia Collins was the wife of army officer M. Griffith Berg, who became a Japanese prisoner of war, and died in the Philippines in 1944. She later married Robert C. Williams (1914-2000).

During his occupation duty in Austria, Collins met Irene Gehmacher, a native of that country. After his divorce from his first wife, he married Irene, who died in 1987.

Controversy
Recent writers have found fault with Collins and other officers who performed occupation duty after World War II, suggesting that they requisitioned luxury items from the Hungarian Gold Train for furnishing their offices and quarters — items allegedly taken from Jewish families by the Nazis during the war. Many items were not returned to their original owners, who could not be located, but were later sold at auctions, with the proceeds used to aid war refugees.

Decorations
Collins was an honorary citizen of both Salzburg and Linz.

Collins' ribbon bar included:

See also

References

External links
Generals of World War II

|-

|-

|-

1895 births
1963 deaths
United States Army Infantry Branch personnel
Military personnel from Chicago
United States Army Command and General Staff College alumni
United States Army War College alumni
Recipients of the Distinguished Service Medal (US Army)
Recipients of the Silver Star
Chevaliers of the Légion d'honneur
Recipients of the Croix de Guerre 1939–1945 (France)
United States Army personnel of World War I
United States Army generals of World War II
United States Army generals